Nanna Thamma is a 1970 Indian Kannada-language film, directed by K. Babu Rao and produced by K. V. Guptha. The film stars Rajkumar, Jayanthi, Gangadhar and R. Nagendra Rao. The film has musical score by Ghantasala. The movie is a remake of the director's own 1969 Telugu movie Jarigina Katha. Ghantasala retained the Telugu song "Bhale Manchi Roju" in the Kannada version as "Ide Hosa Haadu". The film was not a huge success at the box office.

Cast

Rajkumar
Jayanthi
Gangadhar
R. Nagendra Rao
Balakrishna
Dinesh
Nagappa
H. R. Shastry
Hanumanthachar
Shyam
Thimmayya
Narayan
Master Prakash
C. Nageshwara Rao
Vijayabhanu
Ramadevi
Papamma
Baby Brahmaji
B. Jayamma in Guest Appearance

Soundtrack
The music was composed by Ghantasala. Ghantasala retained the Telugu song "Bhale Manchi Roju" in the Kannada version as "Ide Hosa Haadu".

References

External links
 

1970 films
Indian drama films
1970s Kannada-language films
Kannada remakes of Telugu films
Films scored by Ghantasala (musician)